The 1952–53 season was Cardiff City F.C.'s 26th season in the Football League. They competed in the 22-team Division One, then the first tier of English football, finishing twelfth.

Season review

Football League First Division

Partial league table

Results by round

FA Cup
Entering in the third round, Cardiff were eliminated by Football League Third Division North side Halifax Town after a 3–1 defeat.

Welsh Cup
After a 5–2 victory over Merthyr Tydfil in the fifth round, Cardiff received a bye into the seventh round, advancing to the semi-finals with a 3–2 win over Barry Town. Their campaign came to an end following a 1–0 semi-final defeat to Rhyl.

Players

Fixtures and results

First Division

FA Cup

Welsh Cup

See also
List of Cardiff City F.C. seasons

References

Cardiff City F.C. seasons
Cardiff City
Card